San Rafael is a district of the Vázquez de Coronado canton, in the San José province of Costa Rica.

History
The main settlement of Toyopán, the city of Apaikan, was located in this district.

Geography 
San Rafael has an area of  km² and an elevation of  metres.

Demographics 

For the 2011 census, San Rafael had a population of  inhabitants.

Transportation

Road transportation 
The district is covered by the following road routes:
 National Route 216
 National Route 307

References 

Districts of San José Province
Populated places in San José Province